Johannes Wurtz (born 19 June 1992) is a German professional footballer who plays as a forward for SV Wehen Wiesbaden.

Career
Wurtz came through 1. FC Saarbrücken's youth setup, and made his first-team debut in July 2011, when he replaced Ufuk Özbek in a DFB-Pokal match against FC Erzgebirge Aue. He joined SV Werder Bremen in July 2012. A year later he joined SC Paderborn 07, on loan.

On 14 April 2014, SC Paderborn announced, against Wurtz's will, that he would transfer to SpVgg Greuther Fürth for next season. The announcement caused huge outrage since only six days later both teams would face each other and both were also in bitter competition for promotion to the Bundesliga at that time. Eventually Paderborn even decided to remove Wurtz from the squad against Fürth. Although he was taken back in the squad afterwards he only played five minutes at one substitution in the remaining three matches of the season. At the end of the season Paderborn was promoted and Fürth stayed in the 2. Bundesliga.

At Fürth Wurtz signed a three-year contract expiring June 2017 while Werder Bremen which still held the transfer rights received a free of reportedly €200,000 and secured a repurchase option.

In August 2018, Wurtz joined 2. Bundesliga side SV Darmstadt 98 from league rivals VfL Bochum on a three-year contract.

He moved to SV Wehen Wiesbaden on a one-year contract in August 2020.

Career statistics

References

External links

1992 births
Living people
Association football forwards
German footballers
Germany youth international footballers
Bundesliga players
2. Bundesliga players
3. Liga players
1. FC Saarbrücken players
SV Werder Bremen II players
SV Werder Bremen players
SC Paderborn 07 players
SpVgg Greuther Fürth players
VfL Bochum players
SV Darmstadt 98 players
SV Wehen Wiesbaden players
Sportspeople from Neunkirchen, Saarland